Johnny Pulado Estrada III (born June 27, 1976) is an American former professional baseball catcher, who played in Major League Baseball (MLB) for the Philadelphia Phillies, Atlanta Braves, Arizona Diamondbacks, Milwaukee Brewers, and Washington Nationals.

Estrada was selected in the 17th round of the 1997 Major League Baseball draft by the Philadelphia Phillies. In , he became a part-time player. Estrada was acquired by the Atlanta Braves from the Phillies on December 20, 2002, for Kevin Millwood in a move that was said to be financially motivated, since the Braves could not pay Millwood's salary. During the  season, Estrada spent most of the year on Atlanta's Triple-A team, the Richmond Braves. He hit .314 with 9 home runs and 76 RBI. Estrada also made the All-Star team and helped Atlanta win their 13th division title in a row. After a slightly disappointing  season, Estrada was traded by the Braves to the Arizona Diamondbacks for pitchers Lance Cormier and Óscar Villarreal on December 7, 2005.

The  season saw Estrada return to his All-Star form. He hit .302 with 11 home runs and 71 RBI in 115 games. After the 2006 season, Estrada was traded to the Milwaukee Brewers along with pitchers Claudio Vargas and Greg Aquino for pitchers Doug Davis and Dana Eveland and outfielder Dave Krynzel.

On November 20, Estrada was traded from the Brewers to the New York Mets for pitcher Guillermo Mota. Estrada was not offered a new contract by the Mets and became a free agent on December 12, 2007. On January 31, Estrada signed a one-year contract with the Washington Nationals worth approximately $1.25 million. On July 24, Estrada was designated for assignment, and released on July 31.

Estrada holds the major league record for most career hits without a triple (576).

References

External links

Johnny Estrada at Baseball Almanac

1976 births
Living people
Baseball players from California
Major League Baseball catchers
Philadelphia Phillies players
Atlanta Braves players
Arizona Diamondbacks players
Milwaukee Brewers players
Washington Nationals players
Batavia Clippers players
Richmond Braves players
College of the Sequoias Giants baseball players
American baseball players of Mexican descent
Gulf Coast Nationals players
Harrisburg Senators players
Columbus Clippers players
Sportspeople from Hayward, California
Silver Slugger Award winners